Park Jong-chan (born 2 October 1981) is a retired South Korean footballer who played as midfielder.

Career
He joined Incheon United in 2005, but he didn't make any appearance in 2005 K-League. He was released by Incheon in 2006.

He moved to Suwon FC from INGNEX FC in 2007.

References

External links 

1981 births
Living people
Association football forwards
Hannam University alumni
South Korean footballers
Incheon United FC players
Suwon FC players
Korea National League players
K League 2 players
K League 1 players